Magnus Lekven (born 13 January 1988) is a Norwegian footballer who plays as a midfielder for Norwegian club Odd and the Norwegian national team.

Club career
Lekven was born in Porsgrunn, and started his career for Odd Grenland where he made his debut when he was 17 years old against Vålerenga.

On 22 August 2012 Lekven signed a deal with Esbjerg fB from 1 January 2013, but a week later the two clubs agreed on a transfer that made it possible for Lekven to move to the Danish club before his contract with Odd Grenland expired.

He played an important part in Esbjerg's good spring season form, that saw them finishing 4th in the Danish Superliga and winning the Danish Cup. In the Danish Cup final Lekven was named the Cup Fighter.

International career
Lekven has several national youth matches, and has represented Norway at every level from U16 to U23. Lekven made his debut for the senior national team when he replaced Ruben Yttergård Jenssen as a substitute in the 85th minute in a 1-1 friendly draw against Denmark on 15 January 2012.

Career statistics

References

External links
 Magnus Lekven on Esbjerg fB
 

1988 births
Living people
Sportspeople from Skien
Sportspeople from Porsgrunn
Norwegian footballers
Norway international footballers
Norway under-21 international footballers
Norway youth international footballers
Odds BK players
Esbjerg fB players
Vålerenga Fotball players
Eliteserien players
Norwegian First Division players
Danish Superliga players
Norwegian Second Division players
Norwegian expatriate footballers
Expatriate men's footballers in Denmark
Norwegian expatriate sportspeople in Denmark
Association football midfielders